There have been a number of creations of baronets with the surname Smith (as distinct from Smyth and Smythe).

Smith of Crantock, Cornwall (27 September 1642)
Created in the Baronetage of England
Sir William Smith, 1st Baronet, of Crantock (died )
(extinct on his death)

Smith of Hatherton, Cheshire (16 August 1660)
Created in the Baronetage of England.
Sir Thomas Smith, 1st Baronet, MP for Cheshire 1661–1675 (born c.1622; died 22 May 1675)
Sir Thomas Smith, 2nd Baronet (died c. May 1706)
(Extinct on his death)

Smith of Edmondthorpe, Leics (20 March 1661)
Created in the Baronetage of England.
Sir Edward Smith, 1st Baronet, of Edmondthorpe, MP for Leicestershire 1653 (born c. 1630; died 6 September 1707) High Sheriff of Leicestershire, 1666
Sir Edward Smith, 2nd Baronet (born c. 1655; died 15 February 1721)
(Extinct on his death)

Smith (or Smyth) of Long Ashton, Somerset (1661)
The Smiths were resident at Long Ashton, Somerset from 1547.
The Baronetcy was created in the Baronetage of England on 16 May 1661 following the English Restoration, in recognition of the family's loyalty to the Crown for Hugh Smith of Ashton Court.
Sir Hugh Smith, 1st Baronet (died 28 July 1680)
Sir John Smith, 2nd Baronet (born c.1655; died 26 May 1726)
Sir John Smith, 3rd Baronet (died July 1741)
Although the baronetcy was extinct on the death of the third Baronet it was recreated in 1763 for the husband of his daughter and heiress Florence – see below for further details..

Smith, later Bowyer-Smyth baronets, of Hill Hall (1661)
See Bowyer-Smyth baronets

Smith of Isleworth, Middlesex (20 April 1694)

Created in the Baronetage of England. The first baronet was a grandson of James Smith (1587-1667) of Hammersmith, Middlesex (born in Cookham, Berkshire), an Alderman of the City of London, a member of the Worshipful Company of Salters and a Governor of Christ's Hospital, whose monument survives in St Paul's Church, Hammersmith. Arms: Azure, a lion rampant or on a chief argent a mullet gules between two torteaux.
Sir John Smith, 1st Baronet (died 16 August 1726)
Sir John Smith, 2nd Baronet (died 11 October 1760)
(Extinct on his death)

Smith, now Bromley baronets, of East Stoke (1757)
see Bromley baronets

Smith (or Smyth) of Long Ashton, Somerset (1763)
This was a recreation of the 1661 baronetcy, this time in the Baronetage of Great Britain on 27 January 1763 for Jarrit Smyth MP, husband of Florence Smith, daughter and heiress of the deceased third Baronet (see above).

The first Baronet was succeeded by his son and subsequently by two nephews. Lack of male issue resulted in the extinction of the baronetcy in 1849.

Sir Jarrit Smith, 1st Baronet, MP for Bristol (born c.1692; died 24 January 1783)
Sir John Hugh Smith, 2nd Baronet (born c.1735; died 30 March 1802)
Sir Hugh Smyth, 3rd Baronet (born 3 July 1772; died 28 January 1824)
Sir John Smyth, 4th Baronet (born 9 February 1776; died 19 May 1849)

The family estates at Ashton Court and in Bristol and Gloucestershire passed in 1849 to Florence Smith, sister of the third and fourth Baronets. She had married John Upton and on her death in 1852 the estates passed to her grandson John Henry Greville Upton for whom the baronetcy was recreated for the second time in 1859 under the title Smyth of Ashton Court – see Smyth baronets for further details.

Smith (sometime Wyldebore-Smith), later Smith-Marriott baronets of Sydling St Nicholas, Dorset (1774)
see Smith-Marriott baronets

Smith, later Smith-Dodsworth baronets (1784)
see Smith-Dodsworth baronets

Smith, later Cusack-Smith baronets, of Tuam (1799)
see Cusack-Smith baronets

Smith, later Eardley baronets, of Hadley (1802)
The Smith, later Eardley Baronetcy, of Hadley in the County of Middlesex, was created in the Baronetage of the United Kingdom on 22 December 1802. For more information on this creation, see Eardley baronets.

Smith, later Spencer-Smith baronets, of Tring Park (1804)
see Spencer-Smith baronets

Smith of Eardiston, Worcs (23 September 1809)
Created in the Baronetage of the United Kingdom. The succession was for many years thought to have been as follows:
Sir William Smith, 1st Baronet of Eardiston (died 1821)
Sir Christopher Sidney Smith, 2nd Baronet (born 14 May 1798; died 7 August 1839)
Sir William Smith, 3rd Baronet (born 5 October 1823; died 4 January 1893)
Sir William Sydney Winwood Smith, 4th Baronet (born 1 April 1879; died 27 June 1953)
Sir Christopher Sydney Winwood Smith, 5th Baronet (born 20 September 1906; died 3 December 2000)
The Baronetcy then became dormant, not having been  proved by:
Robert Christopher Sydney Winwood Smith (born 1939)

Since the publication of Debrett's Peerage and Baronetage 2011, however, it has been accepted that the 4th Baronet was the product of the bigamous second marriage of his father Christopher Sydney Winwood Smith (1846-1887; son of the 3rd Baronet as above, but predeceased him) in 1877 to Caroline Holland, and was not in line to inherit the title; Christopher Sydney Winwood Smith's first marriage, in 1870, was to Anne Mogan, and it was their son, William Sidney Winwood Smith (1872-1954), that was entitled to succeed as 4th Baronet. His son, Sidney Richard Smith (1907-1983) would have been the 5th Baronet, succeeded by his second cousin, Antony Winwood Smith (1920-1993) as 6th Baronet. This line was unaware of their succession to the baronetcy. Debrett's 2011 states the title to have been extinct in 1993 at the death in Bulawayo, Zimbabwe of Sir Antony Winwood Smith, 6th Baronet, this being confirmed by the Registrar of the Official Roll of the Baronetage in 2008.

The succession of the baronetcy, per the above, would thus have been as follows:
Sir William Smith, 1st Baronet of Eardiston (died 1821)
Sir Christopher Sidney Smith, 2nd Baronet (born 14 May 1798; died 7 August 1839)
Sir William Smith, 3rd Baronet (born 5 October 1823; died 4 January 1893)
Sir William Sidney Winwood Smith, 4th Baronet (born 1872; died 1954)
Sir Sidney Richard Smith, 5th Baronet (born 20 September 1906; died 3 December 1983)
Sir Antony Winwood Smith, 6th Baronet (born 1920; died 1993)

Smith of Pickering, Canada 30 August 1821)
Created in the Baronetage of the United Kingdom.
Sir David William Smith, 1st Baronet (born 4 September 1764; died 9 May 1837)
(Extinct on his death)

Smith, later Smith-Gordon (1838)
see Smith-Gordon baronets

Smith of Aliwal, Punjab (1846)
Created in the Baronetage of the United Kingdom.
Sir Harry George Wakelyn Smith, 1st Baronet, Governor of the Cape of Good Hope 1847–1852 (born 28 June 1787; died 12 October 1860)
(Extinct on his death)

Smith of Stratford Place, London (6 September 1897)
Created in the Baronetage of the United Kingdom.
Sir Thomas Smith, 1st Baronet (born 23 March 1833; died 1 October 1909)
Sir Thomas Rudolph Hampden Smith, 2nd Baronet (born 24 January 1869; died 25 June 1958)
Sir Thomas Turner Smith, 3rd Baronet (born 28 June 1903; died 11 May 1961)
Sir Thomas Gilbert Smith, 4th Baronet (born 2 July 1937; died 13 February 2003)
Sir Andrew Thomas Smith, 5th Baronet (born 17 October 1965)

Smith, later Prince-Smith baronets, of Hillbrook (1911)
The Smith, later Prince-Smith Baronetcy, of Hillbrook in the County of York, was created in the Baronetage of the United Kingdom on 11 February 1911. For more information on this creation, see Prince-Smith baronets.

Smith, later Hamilton-Smith baronets, of Colwyn Bay, Denbigh (9 July 1912)
See Baron Colwyn

Smith of Birkenhead, Cheshire (24 January 1918)
Created in the Baronetage of the United Kingdom.
See Baron Birkenhead

Smith of Kidderminster, Worcs (30 June 1920)
Created in the Baronetage of the United Kingdom.
Sir Herbert Smith, 1st Baronet (born 22 June 1872; died 14 July 1943)
Sir Herbert Smith, 2nd Baronet (born 26 September 1903; died 12 July 1961)
(Extinct on his death)

Smith, later Reardon Smith baronets, of Appledore (1922)
see Reardon Smith baronets

Smith of Crowmallie, Aberdeen (22 June 1945)
Created in the Baronetage of the United Kingdom.
Sir Robert Workman Smith, 1st Baronet (7 December 1880 – 6 December 1957)
Sir William Gordon Smith, 2nd Baronet (30 January 1916 – 20 May 1983)
Sir Robert Hill Smith, 3rd Baronet (born 15 April 1958)

Smith baronets, of Keighley, Yorks (28 June 1947)
Created in the Baronetage of the United Kingdom  for Bracewell Smith. The Bracewell-Smith Family are a family dynasty of hoteliers, who also have strong links to Arsenal Football Club. They are cousins of the Carr family.
Sir Bracewell Smith, 1st Baronet (29 June 1884 – 12 January 1966)
Sir George Bracewell-Smith, 2nd Baronet MBE (5 November 1912 – 18 September 1976). Bracewell-Smith was the son of Sir Bracewell Smith, 1st Baronet. He was educated at Wrekin College and Emmanuel College, Cambridge. He married Helene Marie Hydock from Philadelphia in 1951.  They had two children, Guy Bracewell Smith and Charles Bracewell-Smith. He was Chairman of Park Lane Hotel Ltd and Ritz Hotel Ltd before retiring in 1966. He died the same year and was succeeded by his eldest son, Guy.
Sir Guy Bracewell-Smith, 3rd Baronet (12 December 1952 – 1983). Bracewell-Smith was educated at Harrow School. He died in 1983 and was succeeded by his younger brother, Charles.
Sir Charles Bracewell-Smith, 4th Baronet (born 13 October 1955). Bracewell-Smith was educated at Harrow School. He is the founder of the Homestead Charitable Trust and author of "The Song of the Saints". He succeeded to the baronetcy after the death of his brother Guy Bracewell Smith in 1983 at the age of 30. In 1977 he married Carol Hough, who died in 1994 of Cancer. He subsequently remarried, in 1996, Nina Kakkar. Sir Charles is cousin of Richard Carr and Clive Carr, who with his wife are directors of Arsenal FC. He has no children.

There is no heir to the baronetcy.

See also
 Smyth baronets
 Smythe baronets
 Bowyer-Smyth baronets - comprising Smith, Smyth, Smijth, Bowyer-Smijth and Bowyer-Smyth baronets

Notes

References

Extinct baronetcies in the Baronetage of England
Extinct baronetcies in the Baronetage of Great Britain
Baronetcies in the Baronetage of Great Britain
Extinct baronetcies in the Baronetage of Ireland
Extinct baronetcies in the Baronetage of the United Kingdom
Baronetcies in the Baronetage of the United Kingdom
1642 establishments in England